Tero Mäntylä (born 18 April 1991) is a Finnish footballer who most lately played as a defender for SJK.

Career 
A product of his local club TP-Seinäjoki, Mäntylä joined Premier League club Portsmouth in February 2008, only at the age of 16, signing a three-year contract.

However, during his time in England, he never got any chance to prove his merit and only managed to play in two reserve league matches. After his link with Portsmouth expired, he signed with Inter Turku in August 2010. After the 2011 season his contract with Inter expired and he signed a two-and-a-half-year contract with Ludogorets. Mäntylä left the team from Razgrad in the summer of 2014 and moved back to Scandinavia. He made his debut in the national team in Helsinki in a friendly game against Czech Republic on 21 May 2014 (2−2).

Career statistics

Honours

Club 
Ludogorets
 Bulgarian A Group: 2011–12, 2012–13, 2013–14
 Bulgarian Cup: 2011–12, 2013–14
 Bulgarian Supercup: 2012, 2014

References

External links

1991 births
Living people
Finnish footballers
Finland international footballers
Finland under-21 international footballers
Finnish expatriate footballers
TP-Seinäjoki players
Portsmouth F.C. players
FC Inter Turku players
PFC Ludogorets Razgrad players
Aalesunds FK players
HIFK Fotboll players
Seinäjoen Jalkapallokerho players
Veikkausliiga players
Eliteserien players
First Professional Football League (Bulgaria) players
People from Seinäjoki
Association football defenders
Finnish expatriate sportspeople in Norway
Finnish expatriate sportspeople in England
Expatriate footballers in Bulgaria
Expatriate footballers in Norway
Expatriate footballers in England
Sportspeople from South Ostrobothnia